This is a list of the films shot at the Palace of Versailles including its interior and its palace gardens. All films listed here have the approval of the museum administration for location shooting. Some of the films have an unknown title. The dates given are the dates of shooting. Most films have are shot and released in French. Some are shot and released in English.

1900s
Reconstitution d’une fête sous Louis XIV (1904)
Plusieurs scènes sur Marie-Antoinette (1908) Directors: Henri Lavedan et Georges Lenôtre
Reconstitution historique (1908) Director: Georges Fagot
Vues cinématographiques (1909) Director: Georges Fagot

1910s
Vues cinématographiques et reconstitution de scènes (1910) Director: Max Lyon
Reproduction de scènes historiques de l’époque Louis XIV (1910)
L’affaire du collier de la Reine (1911) Director: Camille de Morchon
Vues cinématographiques (1) (1911) Director: C. Gilbert
Vues cinématographiques (2) (1911) Director: Jacques Brindejont-Offenbach
Vues cinématographiques (3) (1911)
Vues cinématographiques (1) (1913)
Vues cinématographiques en couleur (2) (1913)
Vues cinématographiques (3) (1913) Director: Arthur Bernede
Vue cinématographique (1915)
Scènes cinématographiques (1916) Director: M. Rivers
Films d’une pièce historique tirée de la guerre actuelle (1917) Director: Th. Drouvillé

1920s
Vues cinématographiques d’un modèle réduit d’hydravion (1921)
L’Aiglonne (1921) Directors: Emile Keppens and René Navarre
L’enfant-roi (1923) Director: Jean Kremm
Le vert galant (1924) Director: René Leprince
The Princess and the Clown (1924) Director: André Hugon
Fanfan la Tulipe (1925) Director: René Leprince
Napoléon (1925-27) Director: Abel Gance
The Magician (1926) Director: Rex Ingram
Voir Versailles et mourir (1926) Director: Henri Diamant-Berger
Printemps d’amour (1927) IMDb Director: Léonce Perret
The Farewell Waltz (1928) Director: Henry Roussell
La fin de Monte-Carlo (1928) IMDb Directors: Mario Nalpas et Henri Étiévant
The Queen's Necklace (1929) Directors: Gaston Ravel et Tony Lekain
End of the World (1929-31) Director: Abel Gance

1930s
A Caprice of Pompadour (1930-31) Directors: Joë Hamman and Willi Wolff
Romance à l'inconnue (1930) IMDb Director: René Barberis
Au jardin de la Pompadour (1932) Directors: Casadesus et Taponier
Casanova (1934) Director: René Barberis
Qui va à la chasse ou les soins inutiles (court-métrage) (1934)
Marie Antoinette (1938) Director: W. S. Van Dyke

1940s
Le Mariage de Chiffon (1941) IMDb Director: Claude Autant-Lara
Pamela (1944) Director: Pierre de Hérain
L’affaire des poisons (1944)
Échec au roy (1944) IMDb Director: Jean-Paul Paulin
The Idiot (1946) Director: Georges Lampin
The Queen's Necklace (1946) Director: Marcel L'Herbier
La dynastie des Nguyen (1949)
The Treasure of Cantenac (1949-50) Director: Sacha Guitry
L’esprit de famille (1949)

1950s
Bille de clown (1950) IMDb Director: Jean Wall
La vie commence demain (1950) Director: Nicole Védrès
L’homme qui marche (1951)
Rendez-vous à Versailles (1953)
Capitaine Pantoufle (1953) Director: Guy Lefranc
The Earrings of Madame de… (1953) Director: Max Ophüls
La France est un jardin (1953)
The Lovers of Midnight (1953) Director: Roger Richebé
La Dame aux camélias (1953) IMDb Director: Raymond Bernard
Royal Affairs in Versailles (1953) Director: Sacha Guitry
Napoléon (1954-55) Director: Sacha Guitry
Unknown title (1954)
Madame du Barry (1954) Director: Christian-Jaque
House of Ricordi (1954) Director: Carmine Gallone
Marie Antoinette Queen of France (1955) Director: Jean Delannoy
Frou-Frou (1955) Director: Augusto Genina
Unknown title (1955) Director: Raymond Larrain
Funny Face (1956-57) Director: Stanley Donen
Décembre, mois des enfants (1956) Director: Henri Storck
Les Espions (1957) Director: Henri-Georges Clouzot
The Fox of Paris (1957) Director: Paul May
The Perfect Furlough (1957) IMDb Director: Blake Edwards
Unknown title (1957) Director: Edouard Logereau
Unknown title (1958) Director: Sacha Kamenka
Le Bossu (1959) Director: André Hunebelle
L’An II (1959)

1960s
Petite suite pour jardins (1960)
Un Martien à Paris (1960) IMDb Director: Jean-Daniel Daninos
Fonderie (1960)
Paris Blues (1960-61) Director: Martin Ritt
Vive Henri IV, vive l'amour (1960-61) Director: Claude Autant-Lara
Four Horsemen of the Apocalypse (1960) Director: Vincente Minnelli
Five Day Lover (1960) Director: Philippe de Broca
Demain Paris (1960)
Unknown title (1960)
Napoléon II l'Aiglon (1961) Director: Claude Boissol
Unknown title (1961)
Femmes de Paris (1961)
La Fayette (1961) Director: Jean Dréville
The Mysteries of Paris (1962) Director: André Hunebelle
Robespierre (1962)
Le temps des copains (1962) IMDb Director: Robert Guez
Le temps d’Emma (1963)
La Prima Donna  (1963) IMDb Director: Philippe Lifchitz
La Belle Vie (1963) IMDb Director: Robert Enrico
Angélique, Marquise des Anges (1964) Director: Bernard Borderie
El senor de la Salle (1964) IMDb Director: Luis César Amadori
Angelique and the King (1965) Director: Bernard Borderie
Vingt mille ans à la française (1965)
Rose rosse per Angelica (1965) IMDb Director: Steno
The Taking of Power by Louis XIV (1966, TV film) Director: Roberto Rossellini
La petite vertu (1967) IMDb Director: Serge Korber
Parlons français (1967)
Louis XV (1967)
Darling Lili (1967) Director: Blake Edwards
The Tattooed One (Le Tatoué) (1968) Director: Denys de La Patellière
La Chamade (Heartbeat) (1968) Director: Alain Cavalier

1970s
Le moulin de Valmy (1970)
La maison sous les arbres aka The Deadly Trap (1971) IMDb Director: René Clément
Salut l’artiste (1973) IMDb Director: Yves Robert
Lucien Leuwen (1973) (TV) IMDB Director: Claude Autant-Lara
Rude journée pour la reine (1973) IMDb Director: René Allio
Chinese in Paris (1973) IMDb Director: Jean Yanne
Jaroslaw Dabrowski (1974) IMDb Director: Bohdan Poreba
Unknown title (1974)
Romance in Paris (Original title Ba Li yan yu) (1975) IMDb Director: Chi Lu
Marie-Antoinette (TV) (1975) IMDb Director: Guy-André Lefranc 
Monsieur Coffermann (1975)
Unknown title (1975)
Saint Simon (TV) (1975)
Guerres civiles en France (1976) IMDb Directors: François Barat, Joël Farges, Vincent Nordon	
Molière (1977) IMDb Director: Ariane Mnouchkine
Unknown title (1977)
A Little Romance (1978) IMDb Director: George Roy Hill
Unknown title (1978)
Le romantisme est né dans un jardin (1978)
Eutanasia di un amore (1978) IMDb Director: Enrico Maria Salerno
Lady Oscar (1978) IMDb Director: Jacques Demy
Unknown title (1978)
Unknown title (1978)
La manière de montrer les jardins de Versailles (1979)

1980s
Un chien de saison (TV) (1980) IMDb Director: Bernard-Roland
Miss (Morison's) Moberly’s ghosts (1980) IMDb Director: John Bruce
Madame de Maintenon (TV) (1980)
La chanson du Mal-Aimé (1981)
La nuit de Varennes (1981) IMDb Director: Ettore Scola
Le bourgeois gentilhomme (1981) IMDb Director: Roger Coggio
Danton (1982) IMDb Director: Andrzej Wajda
Marquise de Sévigné (TV) (1982)
Vive la sociale (1983) Director: Gérard Mordillat
Unknown title (1983)
Les Fausses confidences (1984) Director: Daniel Maosmann
Liberté, égalité, choucroute (1985) IMDb Director: Jean Yanne
Mon beau-frère a tué ma soeur (1985) Director: Jacques Rouffio
Gentille alouette (1985) Director: Sergio Castilla
Chronos (1985) IMDb Director: Ron Fricke
La Rumba (1986) Director: Roger Hanin
Camille Claudel (1987) IMDb Director: Bruno Nuytten
L’été de la Révolution (1988)IMDb Director: Lazare Iglesis
Valmont (1988) IMDb Director: Miloš Forman
Dangerous Liaisons (1988) IMDb Director: Stephen Frears
Marie-Antoinette, reine d’un seul amour (TV) (1988) Director: Caroline Huppert 
Une nuit à l’Assemblée nationale (1988) Director: Jean-Pierre Mocky
Chouans! (1988) IMDb Director: Philippe de Broca
The Man Who Lived at the Ritz (1988) IMDb Director: Desmond Davis
Manon Roland (1989) IMDb Director: Édouard Molinaro
Le Radeau de la Méduse (1989) IMDb Director: Iradj Azimi
L’Autrichienne (1989) IMDb Director: Pierre Granier-Deferre
The Road to War (1989) IMDb Writer: Charles Wheeler

1990s
L’homme de ma vie (1991) IMDb Director: Jean-Charles Tacchella
Le voleur d’enfant (1991) IMDb Director: Christian de Chalonge
Jefferson in Paris (1991) IMDb Director: James Ivory
Ridicule (1995) IMDb Director: Patrice Leconte
Beaumarchais, l’insolent (1995) IMDb Director: Édouard Molinaro
L’allée du roi (1995) (TV)IMDb Director: Nina Companéez
Les misérables (1999) IMDb Director: Josée Dayan

2000s
Le roi danse (2000)
La Traviata (2000) (TV)
The Affair of the Necklace (2000) IMDb Director: Charles Shyer
Napoléon (2001) (TV) IMDb Director: Yves Simoneau
Dix-huit ans après (2001) 
The Young Casanova (2001) IMDb Director: Giacomo Battiato
Les Amants réguliers (2004) IMDb Director: Philippe Garrel
Marie-Antoinette (2006) IMDb Director: Sofia Coppola
Un automne musical à Versailles IMDb Director: Olivier Simonnet
Molière ou le comédien malgré lui (2006) IMDb Director: Laurent Tirard
Jean de la Fontaine (2006) IMDb Director: Daniel Vigne
Versailles, le rêve d’un roi (2007) IMDb Director: Thierry Binisti
Versailles (2007) IMDb Director: Pierre Schöller
Louis XV, le soleil noir (2009) IMDb Director: Thierry Binisti
Nannerl, la soeur de Mozart (2009) IMDb Director: René Féret Review

2010s
Midnight in Paris (2010) IMDb Director: Woody Allen
30° Couleur (2012) IMDb Director: Lucien Jean-Baptiste
The Legendary Chevalier De Saint-George (2011) (TV) IMDb Director/Writer: Claude Ribbe
Louis XVI, l’homme qui ne voulait pas être roi (2011) Director: Thierry Binisti
Farewell, My Queen - Les Adieux à la Reine (2012) Director: Benoît Jacquot

See also

List of films shot at the British Museum
List of films shot at Parkwood Estate

Sources
Liste des films tournés au domaine de Versailles
Internet Movie Database (IMDb)

Versailles
Films shot